Adlikon bei Andelfingen (or simply Adlikon) is a former municipality in the district of Andelfingen in the canton of Zürich in Switzerland. On 1 January 2023 the former municipalities of Adlikon and Humlikon merged to form the municipality of Andelfingen.

History
Adlikon is first mentioned in 1255 as Adilinkon.

Geography

Of this area, 66% is used for agricultural purposes, while 23% is forested. Of the rest of the land, 8.6% is settled (buildings or roads) and the remainder (2.4%) is non-productive (rivers, glaciers or mountains).

The municipality is located south of the Thur river.  It includes the hamlets of  Dätwil und Niederwil.

Demographics
, 3.5% of the population was made up of foreign nationals. Over the last 10 years the population has grown at a rate of 1.2%. Most of the population speaks German  (98.1%), with Albanian being second most common ( 1.0%) and English being third ( 0.3%).

In the 2007 election the most popular party was the SVP which received 53% of the vote.  The next three most popular parties were the CSP (9.9%), the Green Party (9.7%) and the SPS (8.6%).

The age distribution of the population is children and teenagers (0–19 years old) make up 29.5% of the population, while adults (20–64 years old) make up 59.3% and seniors (over 64 years old) make up 11.2%.  In Adlikon about 85.6% of the population (between age 25-64) have completed either non-mandatory upper secondary education or additional higher education (either university or a Fachhochschule).

Adlikon has an unemployment rate of 1.62%.  , there were 66 people employed in the primary economic sector and about 27 businesses involved in this sector.  20 people are employed in the secondary sector and there are 5 businesses in this sector.  120 people are employed in the tertiary sector, with 13 businesses in this sector.
The historical population is given in the following table:

 In 1872 Humlikon separated from Adlikon, 1850 numbers are without Humlikon.

References

External links

 Official website 
 

Former municipalities of the canton of Zürich